Ice worms (also written as ice-worms or iceworms) are enchytraeid annelids of the genus Mesenchytraeus. The majority of the species in the genus are abundant in gravel beds or the banks of riverine habitats, but the best-known members of the genus are found in glacial ice. They include the only annelid worms known to spend their entire lives in glacial ice, and some of the few metazoans to complete their entire life cycle at conditions below .
 They were discovered in a wide range of environments, which include level snowfields, steep avalanche cones, crevasse walls, glacial rivers and pools, and hard glacier ice. These organisms are unique in that they can simply move between tightly packed ice crystals. They utilize setae, which are small bristles found on the outside of their bodies, to grip the ice and pull themselves along.
The genus contains 77 species, including the North American glacier ice worm (Mesenchytraeus solifugus) and the Yosemite snow worm (Mesenchytraeus gelidus).

Ice worms eat snow algae and bacteria. They live at zero degrees Celsius (32 degrees Fahrenheit), but if temperatures dip even slightly below that, according to a Washington State University researcher, the worms die.

Species
The genus contains 77 species. They are the following:

Mesenchytraeus affinis Michaelsen, 1901
Mesenchytraeus altus Welch, 1917 
Mesenchytraeus americanus Bell, 1942 
Mesenchytraeus anisodiverticulus Shen, Chen & Xie, 2012 
Mesenchytraeus antaeus Rota & Brinkhurst, 2000 
Mesenchytraeus arcticus Bell, 1962 
Mesenchytraeus argentatus Nurminen, 1973b 
Mesenchytraeus armatus (Levinsen, 1884) 
Mesenchytraeus armatus armatus (Levinsen, 1884) 
Mesenchytraeus armatus kananaskis Dash, 1970 
Mesenchytraeus asiaticus Eisen, 1904 
Mesenchytraeus atriaphorus Altman, 1936 
Mesenchytraeus beringensis Eisen, 1904 
Mesenchytraeus beumeri (Michaelsen, 1886b) 
Mesenchytraeus bungei Michaelsen, 1901 
Mesenchytraeus cejkai Cernosvitov, 1937d 
Mesenchytraeus celticus Southern, 1909 
Mesenchytraeus chaunus Piper, MacLean & Christensen, 1982 
Mesenchytraeus chromophorus Altman, 1936 
Mesenchytraeus crenobius Timm, 1994 
Mesenchytraeus diplobulbosus Bell, 1949 
Mesenchytraeus diverticulatus Piper, MacLean & Christensen, 1982 
Mesenchytraeus eastwoodi Eisen, 1904 
Mesenchytraeus eltoni Stephenson, 1925 
Mesenchytraeus falciformis Eisen, 1878 
Mesenchytraeus flavidus Michaelsen, 1887 
Mesenchytraeus flavus (Levinsen, 1884) 
Mesenchytraeus fontinalis Eisen, 1904 
Mesenchytraeus fontinalis fontinalis Eisen, 1904 
Mesenchytraeus fontinalis gracilis Eisen, 1904 
Mesenchytraeus franciscanus Eisen, 1904 
Mesenchytraeus fuscus Eisen, 1904 
Mesenchytraeus fuscus fuscus Eisen, 1904 
Mesenchytraeus fuscus inermis Eisen, 1904 
Mesenchytraeus gaudens Cognetti, 1903a 
Mesenchytraeus gelidus Welch, 1916 
Mesenchytraeus gigachaetus Xie, 2012
Mesenchytraeus glandulosus (Levinsen, 1884) 
Mesenchytraeus grandis Eisen, 1904 
Mesenchytraeus grebnitzkyi Michaelsen, 1901 
Mesenchytraeus groenlandicus Nielsen & Christensen, 1959 
Mesenchytraeus hamiltoni Healy, 1996b 
Mesenchytraeus harrimani Eisen, 1904 
Mesenchytraeus hydrius Welch, 1919a 
Mesenchytraeus johanseni Welch, 1919b 
Mesenchytraeus kincaidi Eisen, 1904 
Mesenchytraeus kontrimavichusi  Piper, MacLean & Christensen, 1982 
Mesenchytraeus konyamensis Michaelsen, 1916 
Mesenchytraeus kuehnelti Dózsa-Farkas, 1991a 
Mesenchytraeus kuril Healy & Timm, 2000 
Mesenchytraeus lusitanicus Collado, Martínez-Ansemil, and Giani, 1993 
Mesenchytraeus macnabi Bell, 1942 
Mesenchytraeus maculatus Eisen, 1904 
Mesenchytraeus magnus Altman, 1936 
Mesenchytraeus melanocephalus Christensen & Dózsa-Farkas, 1999 
Mesenchytraeus minimus Altman, 1936 
Mesenchytraeus mirabilis Eisen, 1878 
Mesenchytraeus monochaetus Bretscher, 1900 
Mesenchytraeus monodiverticulus Shen, Chen & Xie, 2012
Mesenchytraeus monothecatus Bell, 1945 
Mesenchytraeus multispinus (Grube, 1851) 
Mesenchytraeus nanus Eisen, 1904 
Mesenchytraeus obscurus Eisen, 1904 
Mesenchytraeus ogloblini Černosvitov, 1928b
Mesenchytraeus orcae Eisen, 1904 
Mesenchytraeus pedatus Eisen, 1904 
Mesenchytraeus pelicensis Issel, 1905c 
Mesenchytraeus penicillus Eisen, 1904 
Mesenchytraeus primaevus  Eisen,  1878 
Mesenchytraeus rhithralis Healy & Fend, 2002 
Mesenchytraeus sanguineus Nielsen & Christensen, 1959 
Mesenchytraeus setchelli Eisen, 1904 
Mesenchytraeus solifugus (Emery, 1898) 
Mesenchytraeus solifugus solifugus (Emery, 1898) 
Mesenchytraeus solifugus rainierensis Welch, 1916 
Mesenchytraeus straminicolus Rota, 1995 
Mesenchytraeus sveni Christensen & Dózsa-Farkas, 1999 
Mesenchytraeus svetae Piper, MacLean & Christensen, 1982 
Mesenchytraeus tetrapodus Timm, 1978 
Mesenchytraeus torbeni Christensen & Dózsa-Farkas, 1999 
Mesenchytraeus tundrus Piper, MacLean & Christensen, 1982 
Mesenchytraeus unalaskae Eisen, 1904 
Mesenchytraeus variabilis Cejka, 1914 
Mesenchytraeus vegae Eisen, 1904 
Mesenchytraeus viivi Timm, 1978 
Mesenchytraeus vshivkovae Timm, 1994 

Mesenchytraeus franzi is a junior synonym of Cognettia clarae. Mesenchytraeus megachaetae Shen, Chen & Xie, 2011 has been renamed Mesenchytraeus gigachaetus Xie, 2012 due to the previous name being preoccupied by Mesenchytraeus megachaetae  Bretscher, 1901, a junior synonym of Mesenchytraeus armatus.

See also
Project Iceworm

References

External links 
 Seattle Times Article on Iceworms 

Enchytraeidae